The double flute is an ancient category of wind instrument, a set of flutes that falls under more than one modern category in the Hornbostel Sachs system of musical instrument classification. The flutes may be double because they have parallel pipes that are connected with a single duct. They may be "double vertical flutes" without a duct. There is also a double-transverse flutes.

Double flutes are not the same as double pipes, which are reed instruments.

Background
Flutes use resonant pipes to make their sound, whereas pipes use vibrating reeds. The sounding mechanisms for the two types of instrument are different.

Double flutes can be divided into instruments that consist of a melody pipe matched with a drone pipe, and chord flutes in which the instruments can play the same melody at the same time in two different pitches.

Some forms of double flute include:

 some types of Native American flutes
 the Serbian dvojnice, can be either a flute or a reed pipe.
 the Bulgarian dvoyanka
the Indian and Pakistani Alghoza
the Iranian and Pakistani Donali, pair of fipple flutes
 the Russian double svirel, pair of fipple flutes

Some forms that are reed pipes, not double flutes include:
 the ancient Greek aulos, pair of (double-reed) pipes.
 the Indian and Pakistani pungi, reed pipes
 Mijwiz

Gallery

References

Flutes
Hornbostel–Sachs